Katherine Julissa Rodríguez Peguero (born December 18, 1991, in Santiago de los Caballeros, Santiago) is a Dominican taekwondo practitioner who has won two medals for her home country in regional games.

Career
Katherine won the silver medal in the 2010 Central American and Caribbean Games at the Under 67 kg category.

Rodríguez won the bronze medal at the 67 kg category at the 2011 Pan American Games in Guadalajara, Mexico.

She represented the Dominican Republic at the 2020 Summer Olympics.

She won the 2021 Pan American Championships Bronze medal in the +73 kg category.

References

External links
 

1991 births
Living people
Dominican Republic female taekwondo practitioners
Olympic taekwondo practitioners of the Dominican Republic
Taekwondo practitioners at the 2020 Summer Olympics
Taekwondo practitioners at the 2016 Summer Olympics
Taekwondo practitioners at the 2011 Pan American Games
Taekwondo practitioners at the 2015 Pan American Games
Taekwondo practitioners at the 2019 Pan American Games
Medalists at the 2011 Pan American Games
Pan American Games bronze medalists for the Dominican Republic
Pan American Games medalists in taekwondo
Pan American Taekwondo Championships medalists
Central American and Caribbean Games silver medalists for the Dominican Republic
Competitors at the 2010 Central American and Caribbean Games
Central American and Caribbean Games medalists in taekwondo
21st-century Dominican Republic women